Enrica Rinaldi (born 11 August 1998) is an Italian freestyle wrestler. She won one of the bronze medals in the women's 76 kg event at the 2022 European Wrestling Championships held in Budapest, Hungary. A few months later, she won the silver medal in the 76 kg event at the 2022 Mediterranean Games held in Oran, Algeria.

Career

Freestyle wrestling 

She won one of the bronze medals in her event at the 2018 European U23 Wrestling Championship held in Istanbul, Turkey. She won the silver medal in her event at the 2018 European Juniors Wrestling Championships held in Rome, Italy. She was eliminated in her first match in the 76 kg event at the 2019 European Wrestling Championships held in Bucharest, Romania. She lost her bronze medal match in the 72 kg event at the 2020 European Wrestling Championships held in Rome, Italy.

In 2021, she won one of the bronze medals in the 76 kg event at the Matteo Pellicone Ranking Series 2021 held in Rome, Italy. She was eliminated in her first match in the 76 kg event at the 2021 European Wrestling Championships held in Warsaw, Poland. At the 2021 U23 World Wrestling Championships held in Belgrade, Serbia, she won one of the bronze medals in the 76 kg event. In 2022, she was eliminated in her first match in the 76 kg event at the World Wrestling Championships held in Belgrade, Serbia.

Beach wrestling 

Rinaldi also competes in beach wrestling. She won the silver medal in the women's +70 kg event at the 2019 Mediterranean Beach Games held in Patras, Greece. In 2021, she won the gold medal in her event at the Beach Wrestling World Series event held in Rome, Italy.

Achievements 

Women's freestyle wrestling

Women's beach wrestling

References

External links 
 

Living people
1998 births
Place of birth missing (living people)
Italian female sport wrestlers
European Wrestling Championships medalists
Competitors at the 2022 Mediterranean Games
Mediterranean Games silver medalists for Italy
Mediterranean Games medalists in wrestling
21st-century Italian women